Casanova - is a Russian song written by Alexis Garnizoff and Nikolai Zinoviev. that was first released on Valery Leontiev album Full Moon in 1993.

Editions
 Album Full Moon (1993)
 Album Best songs 1 (Valery Leontiev) (1999)
 Album Star series (Valery Leontiev) (1999)
 Album Golden Collection of Russia (Valery Leontiev) (2000)
 Album The BEST of Valery Leontiev (2001)

External links 
 Valery Leontiev performs Casanova

1993 songs
Valery Leontiev songs